Latin Tinge is an album by pianist Cedar Walton which was recorded in 2002 and released on the Highnote label.

Reception
Allmusic reviewed the album stating "A solid but not outstanding Latin jazz session... Low-key without being low-energy, Latin Tinge fulfills the minor goals it sets for itself". All About Jazz observed "It's jazz by the numbers, played with metronomic regularity, simmering but never boiling over, smoldering but never burning". JazzTimes said "There is more than a tinge of Latin music here; the title could have justifiably been Latin Immersion. The emphasis of the trio is on adhering to proper Latin rhythmic arrangements. Walton's playing is therefore not as florid as we are used to getting from him; he seems to be more concerned with locking in with the rhythm section than in flying above it".

Track listing 
All compositions by Cedar Walton except where noted
 "Brazil" (Ary Barroso) - 7:04
 "Latin America" - 6:14
 "Triste" (Antônio Carlos Jobim) - 4:53
 "Tres Palabras" (Osvaldo Farrés) - 5:55
 "Perfidia" (Alberto Domínguez) - 5:39
 "The Vision" - 6:31
 "Bésame Mucho" (Consuelo Velázquez) - 7:56
 "Serenata" (Leroy Anderson) - 5:30
 "Latino Blue" - 3:53

Personnel 
Cedar Walton - piano
Cucho Martinez - bass
Ray Mantilla - percussion

Production
Don Sickler - producer
Rudy Van Gelder - engineer

References 

Cedar Walton albums
2002 albums
HighNote Records albums
Albums recorded at Van Gelder Studio